Skyscraper is a 2011 Danish drama film written and directed by Rune Schjøtt.

Cast
 Lukas Schwarz Thorsteinsson as Jon
 Marta Holm Peschcke-Køedt as Edith (as Marta Holm)
 Lucas Schultz as Ben
 Morten Suurballe as Farmand
 Rikke Louise Andersson as Vivi
 Lars Brygmann as Helge
 Mads Riisom as Fyr
 Emil Haugelund as Gut
 Julie Grundtvig Wester as Gravid pige
 Helena Wagn Ivansdottir as Tøs (as Helena Wagn Ivandóttir)
 Jeff Pitzner as Pølse
 Anders Hove as Buschauffør

References

External links
 

2011 films
2011 drama films
Danish drama films
2010s Danish-language films